Alison Smyth (born 19 March 1989) is a Northern Irish footballer who plays as a defender and has appeared for the Northern Ireland women's national team.

Career
Smyth has been capped for the Northern Ireland national team, appearing for the team during the 2019 FIFA Women's World Cup qualifying cycle.

References

External links
 
 
 

1989 births
Living people
Women's association footballers from Northern Ireland
Northern Ireland women's international footballers
Women's association football defenders
Linfield Ladies F.C. players
Women's Premiership (Northern Ireland) players